The 12th Annual Streamy Awards was the twelfth installment of the Streamy Awards honoring the best in American streaming television series and their creators. The ceremony was held in The Beverly Hilton in Beverly Hills, California on December 4, 2022. It was hosted by Airrack and livestreamed exclusively to his YouTube channel, making it the first Streamy Awards to be livestreamed to a content creator's channel. It was also the first Streamy Awards to be held in-person since the 9th Streamy Awards in 2019. A number of new gaming-related awards were introduced for the 12th Streamy Awards and an award for VTubers, streamers who use a virtual avatar to present themselves. The Streamys Brand Award were featured for the fifth year in a row and the Creator Honor awards for the third.

Performers 
The 12th Streamy Awards featured a musical performance from Yung Gravy accompanied by viral videos about his songs.

Winners and nominees 

The nominees were announced on October 27, 2022. Winners were announced during the main ceremony on December 4, hosted by Airrack from The Beverly Hilton hotel. Bob the Drag Queen was the live announcer for the event. The Creator For Social Good award was presented by The Elevate Prize Foundation and came with an award of $50,000 to commit to a worthy cause of the winner's choosing.

Winners are listed first, in bold.

Brand Awards

Reception 
Upon release of the list of nominees, Alex Tsiaoussidis of Dot Esports argued that a number of streamers were snubbed from the awards, including Amouranth, Dr Disrespect, Gaules, Ibai, Tarik, and TimTheTatman.

References 

Streamy Awards
2022 in California
2022 awards
2022 in Internet culture